Renart Vafich Suleymanov (born 27 July 1937) is a Russian former sport shooter who competed in the 1968 Summer Olympics.

References

1937 births
Living people
Russian male sport shooters
ISSF pistol shooters
Olympic shooters of the Soviet Union
Shooters at the 1968 Summer Olympics
Olympic bronze medalists for the Soviet Union
Olympic medalists in shooting
Sportspeople from Ufa
Medalists at the 1968 Summer Olympics